Chris Burton is a Danish singer songwriter who became famous with his 2019 debut release "Love Letters" followed by "Little Sister" also in 2019, both charting on Hitlisten, the official Danish Singles Chart. He was considered as one of the most exciting male solo artists to emerge in 2019 from Denmark and performed in Denmark's Spot Festival in May of the same year. He partnered with Tory Lanez for a brand new single titled "What Sucks About Love".

Discography

Singles

References

Danish male singers
Danish songwriters
Living people
Spanish-language singers of Denmark
Year of birth missing (living people)